The 1941 Middle Tennessee State Teachers football team represented the Middle Tennessee State Teachers College (now known as Middle Tennessee State University) as a member of the Southern Intercollegiate Athletic Association (SIAA) during the 1941 college football season. Led by Elwin W. Midgett in his second season as head coach, Middle Tennessee State Teachers compiled an overall record of 4–3–1 with a mark of 2–3–1 in conference play. The team's captains were Dave Adamson and Billy McDonald.

Schedule

References

Middle Tennessee State Teachers
Middle Tennessee Blue Raiders football seasons
Middle Tennessee State Teachers Blue Raiders football